Taherlu may refer to:
 Taherlu, Hamadan
 Taherlu, Zanjan